Panacea Records is an independent American record label founded by Bill Ray and Paul Trust in 1993. The label has a primary focus on rock music but has branched out into electronic and country music as well. Panacea Records has released music by artists including Morgan Wallen, Atom Smash, Endo, and Sunday Driver.

History 
Panacea Records was founded in 1993 by Bill Ray and Paul Trust. Operating primarily out of South Florida, Panacea Records has signed numerous local bands such as Al's Not Well, Endo, and Sunday Driver to record contracts. The band Atom Smash was formed by Sergio Sanchez with the assistance of Panacea Records in 2007. Atom Smash was able to record and release both the Sacrifice and Kill Me EPs under Panacea Records before they eventually signed with Jive Records. In 2014 the country music singer Morgan Wallen met Sergio Sanchez while the former was on The Voice. Sanchez then introduced Wallen to Bill Ray and Paul Trust of Panacea Records who signed the country music singer in 2015. In the same year, Wallen and Panacea recorded and released the EP Stand Alone and Wallen's debut single "Spin You Around". "Spin You Around" has since been streamed over 20 million times on Spotify, over 4 million times on YouTube and over 40 million times worldwide as of July 31, 2020.

Artists signed by Panacea Records 

 Al's Not Well
 Endo
 Sunday Driver
 Atom Smash
 Morgan Wallen

References 

American record labels
Record labels established in 1993
1993 establishments in Florida